The Kerala State Film Award for Best Editor winners:

References

External links 
Official website
PRD, Govt. of Kerala: Awardees List

Kerala State Film Awards
Film editing awards